The 1991 Camel GT Championship and Exxon Supreme GT Series seasons were the 21st season of the IMSA GT Championship auto racing series.  It was for GTP and Lights classes of prototypes, as well as Grand Tourer-style racing cars which ran in the GTO and GTU classes, as well as a tube-frame All-American Challenge (AAC) class during select rounds.  It began February 2, 1991, and ended October 13, 1991, after nineteen rounds.

Schedule
The GT and Prototype classes did not participate in all events, nor did they race together at shorter events.  The AAC class only participated in GT-only events.  Races marked with All had all classes on track at the same time.

Season results

Championship Tables

GTP

External links
 World Sports Racing Prototypes – 1991 IMSA GT Championship results

References

IMSA GT Championship seasons
IMSA GT Championship